The Show Jumping Hall of Fame and Museum is an American organization located at the Kentucky Horse Park in Lexington, Kentucky. It moved to the Kentucky Horse Park in 2010 and was previously located in facilities at Busch Gardens in Tampa, Florida. It came into existence in 1989 as a means to pay homage to the people and horses who have made outstanding contributions to the sport of show jumping.

Inductees

References

 Show Jumping Hall of Fame Official Website
 2009 Inductees
 Kentucky Horse Park

Show jumping
Halls of fame in Kentucky
Sports halls of fame
Awards established in 1987
Equestrian museums in the United States